Victor Leifson Ludlow (born 1943) is an emeritus religion professor at Brigham Young University (BYU) in Provo, Utah and the author of several books on the Book of Isaiah, most notably Isaiah, Prophet Seer and Poet.

Biography 

Ludlow was born in Spanish Fork, Utah but lived in California, Michigan, Indiana, New York City and Provo, Utah while growing up.

Ludlow did his undergraduate studies at BYU. He also served as a missionary for the Church of Jesus Christ of Latter-day Saints (LDS Church) in the Central German Mission of the church (later the Germany Düsseldorf Mission) from 1962 to 1964.

Ludlow then received a Danforth Scholarship and studied at Harvard University and Brandeis University, where he received his Ph.D. in Near Eastern and Judaic Studies.

Ludlow was the awarded the distinction of BYU Honors professor of the year in 2002.
He is also the translator of the selections from the Book of Mormon into Hebrew. This edition was published in 1982 but banned due to an agreement of no-proselytism between the LDS and the Israeli government.

Ludlow is a scholar on Isaiah.  Besides his Isaiah: Prophet Seer and Poet he also wrote Unlocking Isaiah in the Book of Mormon.  He also wrote Unlocking the Old Testament. and Principles and Practices of the Restored Gospel.

While a BYU professor Ludlow was also the main organizing force behind the annual Passover Seder held at BYU.

Ludlow and his wife Virginia Ann have four sons and two daughters.  After V-Ann's death he met and married Cheryl Porter in 2016.  Cheryl has two daughters from a previous marriage.

Ludlow has served in many callings in the LDS Church including multiple times as a bishop and as president of the church's Germany Frankfurt Mission from 1983 to 1986.

Notes

References 
 profile on his own page
 Mary Lynn Johnson, "Religion Professor Promotes Passover Traditions", BYU Magazine, Spring 2000
 Dust jacket "about the author" for Unlocking Isaiah in the Book of Mormon.
 Victor L. Ludlow, “I Have a Question,” ''Ensign, April 1985, p. 37
 Deseret Book bio

1943 births
20th-century Mormon missionaries
American leaders of the Church of Jesus Christ of Latter-day Saints
American Mormon missionaries in Germany
Brandeis University alumni
Brigham Young University alumni
Brigham Young University faculty
Harvard University alumni
Living people
Writers from Provo, Utah
People from Spanish Fork, Utah
English–Hebrew translators
Translators of the Book of Mormon
Mission presidents (LDS Church)
20th-century translators
Latter Day Saints from Utah
Latter Day Saints from California
Latter Day Saints from Michigan
Latter Day Saints from Indiana
Latter Day Saints from New York (state)
Latter Day Saints from Massachusetts
Missionary linguists